Continental toy spaniel may refer to:

 Papillon
 Phalène